Pajares de Adaja is a municipality located in the province of Ávila, Castile and León, Spain. According to the 2004 census (INE), the municipality has a population of 183 inhabitants.

Notable people from Pajares de Adaja
 Ángel Acebes
 Francisco Méndez Ávaro

References

Municipalities in the Province of Ávila